The Nimba flycatcher (Melaenornis annamarulae) is a small passerine bird of the genus Melaenornis in the flycatcher family Muscicapidae. It is native to the West African countries of Côte d'Ivoire, Ghana, Guinea, Liberia and Sierra Leone.

References

External links
BirdLife Species Factsheet.

Nimba flycatcher
Birds of West Africa
Nimba flycatcher